Bougemont is a historic home located at Charleston, West Virginia.  It was the home of two prominent families in Charleston's business development.  It was built about 1916 by Harrison Brooks Smith, an attorney, who served as president of Kanawha Banking and Trust and various companies in Kanawha County. Smith died in 1942, and in 1959, Horace Hamilton Smallridge, another leading Charleston businessman, purchased the property.  Bougemont is symmetrically arranged with a -story central block and two single-story side wings. The entrance facade features a pedimented portico with Corinthian columns.  Also on the property are a cottage, stable, and barn.

It was listed on the National Register of Historic Places in 1984 as part of the South Hills Multiple Resource Area.

References

Houses in Charleston, West Virginia
Colonial Revival architecture in West Virginia
Georgian Revival architecture in West Virginia
Houses completed in 1916
Houses on the National Register of Historic Places in West Virginia
National Register of Historic Places in Charleston, West Virginia